Bernard Devauchelle is a French oral and maxillofacial surgeon, best known for successfully completing the first face transplant in November 2005 at Amiens University Hospital.

References 

Living people
French transplant surgeons
Year of birth missing (living people)
21st-century French physicians
21st-century surgeons